Daroga Prasad Rai (2 September 1922 – 15 April 1981) was an Indian politician from the state of Bihar. He was the Chief Minister of Bihar in 1970 for ten months, but Congress was reduced to a minority in December 1970 and Karpoori Thakur became the first socialist Chief Minister for a few months, with Jana Sangh support. From 2 July 1973 to 11 April 1975 he was the Deputy Chief Minister and incharge of Finance in Abdul Gafoor's ministry.In the 1990s when the Janata Dal family began to be dominant in politics than the son Chandrika Rai also accompanied Lalu Prasad Yadav. Chandrika Roy is the second son of the five sons of Dara Raja Rai. Daroga Prasad's Rai grand daughter Aishwarya Rai married to Tej Pratap Yadav, the eldest son of Lalu Prasad Yadav on 12 May 2018.

In Bihar Legislative assembly
In second General Elections held in 1957 he contested from Parsa constituency of Bihar Vidhan Sabha and won.

In Memory
 Daroga Prasad Rai Degree College, Siwan district Bihar.

See also
Daroga Prasad Rai Path

References

Chief Ministers of Bihar
Year of death missing
1922 births
Leaders of the Opposition in the Bihar Legislative Assembly
People from Saran district
Bihar MLAs 1969–1972
Chief ministers from Indian National Congress
Indian National Congress politicians
Deputy Chief Ministers of Bihar
State cabinet ministers of Bihar
Indian National Congress politicians from Bihar